Paromomyidae is a family of mammals that may include the earliest primates, or taxa closely related to them.

References 

Plesiadapiformes
Prehistoric mammal families
Taxa named by George Gaylord Simpson